Pierre Chrétien (1846 – 15 June 1934, in Nay, Pyrénées-Atlantiques) was a French entomologist who specialised in Lepidoptera. He was a member of Société entomologique de France. Trifurcula chretieni Z. & A. Lastuvka & van Nieukerken, 2013 is "named in honour of Pierre Chrétien (1846–1934), who discovered nepticulid mines on Bupleurum, including those on Bupleurum rigidum, and the first author to describe a number of Mediterranean species that are now placed in Trifurcula (Glaucolepis)." His collection is held by National Museum of Natural History in Paris.

Works
Partial list
Chrétien, P. (1899). "Description d'un nouveau genre et d'une nouvelle espèce de Microlépidoptère". Bulletin de la Société entomologique de France. 1899: 206.
————— (1900). "Les Coleophora du Dorycnium". Naturaliste. 1900: 68–70.
————— (1901). "Description d'une nouvelle espèce de Teleia [Microlep.]". Bulletin de la Société entomologique de France. 1901: 10–12.
————— (1907). "Description de nouvelles espèces de Lépidoptères d'Algerie". Bulletin de la Société Entomologique de France. 18: 305–308.
————— (1915). "Contribution á la connaissance des Lépidopteres du Nord de l'Afrique. Notes biologiques et criques". Annales de la Société Entomologique de France. 84: 289–374.
————— (1917). "Contribution á la connaissance des Lépidopteres du Nord de l'Afrique". Annales de la Société Entomologique de France. 85: 369–502.

See also
 :Category:Taxa named by Pierre Chrétien

References
Anonymous (1934). "Chretien, P." Bulletin de la Société Entomologique de France. Paris 39.
Lhoste, J. (1987). Les entomologistes français. 1750–1950. INRA (Institut National de la Recherche Agronomique), 1–355.
Luquet, G. C. (2009). Alexanor, Revue française de Lépidoptérologie Cinquantième anniversaire. Paris 24 (1): 5–62 ISSN 0002-5208.

French lepidopterists
1846 births
1934 deaths
People from Béarn
19th-century French zoologists
20th-century French zoologists